The Boston Athenaeum is one of the oldest independent libraries in the United States. It is also one of a number of membership libraries, for which patrons pay a yearly subscription fee to use  Athenaeum services. The institution was founded in 1807 by the Anthology Club of Boston, Massachusetts.  It is located at 10½ Beacon Street on Beacon Hill.

Resources of the Boston Athenaeum include a large circulating book collection; a public gallery; a rare books collection of over 100,000 volumes; an art collection of 100,000 paintings, sculptures, prints, drawings, photographs, and decorative arts; research collections including one of the world's most important collections of primary materials on the American Civil War; and a public forum offering lectures, readings, concerts, and other events. Special treasures include the largest portion of President George Washington's library from Mount Vernon; Houdon busts of Washington, Benjamin Franklin, and Lafayette once owned by Thomas Jefferson; a first edition copy of Audubon's The Birds of America; a 1799 set of Goya's Los caprichos; portraits by Gilbert Stuart, Chester Harding, and John Singer Sargent; and one of the most extensive collections of contemporary artists' books in the United States.

The Boston Athenaeum is also known for the many prominent writers, scholars, and politicians who have been members, including Ralph Waldo Emerson, Nathaniel Hawthorne, Louisa May Alcott, Oliver Wendell Holmes Sr., Oliver Wendell Holmes Jr., John Quincy Adams, Margaret Fuller, Francis Parkman, Amy Lowell, John F. Kennedy, and Edward M. Kennedy.

History

19th century
In 1803, a young Harvard graduate by the name of Phineas Adams established the magazine The Monthly Anthology, or Magazine of Polite Literature.  Adams left the New England area in 1804, having insufficient funds to continue the periodical; however, the printers Munroe and Francis convinced other young men to contribute to and continue the magazine under the new title of The Monthly Anthology and Boston Review. By 1805, these young men founded the Anthology Society.

The Boston Athenaeum was founded in 1807 by members of the Anthology Society, literary individuals who began with a plan to have a reading room.  The first librarian, William Smith Shaw, and the new trustees had ambitious plans for the Athenaeum, basing their vision on the Athenæum and Lyceum in Liverpool, England. Their vision was expanded to include a library encompassing books in all subjects in English and foreign languages, a gallery of sculptures and paintings, collections of coins and natural curiosities, and even a laboratory. This ambitious design has developed over the past two hundred years with some changes in focus (e.g., there is no chemistry lab) but remaining true to the ideal expressed in the institution's seal, chosen in 1814: Literarum fructus dulces, meaning "Sweet are the Fruits of Letters."

The first yearly subscriptions were sold for ten dollars; only members were allowed to enter the Athenaeum's rooms, although they could bring guests.  The Athenaeum's collections were initially non-circulating, meaning that even members could not check out books to take home.

At first, the Boston Athenaeum rented rooms, then in 1809 bought a small house adjacent to the King's Chapel Burying Ground, and in 1822 moved into a mansion on Pearl Street, where a lecture hall and gallery space were added within four years.

In 1823, Shaw stepped down as librarian, and the King's Chapel Library and the Theological Library belonging to the Boston Association of Ministers were deposited in the Athenaeum.  Work was begun on a shelf catalog in 1827. That same year, the art gallery was established, and the first annual exhibition opened. Measures were undertaken in 1830 to turn the collections into a circulating library. Once the Athenaeum became a circulating library, only four books were allowed to be checked out at a time.

10½ Beacon Street
By the early 1840s, Boston was a fast-growing city, and Pearl Street was built up commercially, with warehouses crowding around the Athenæum building. The trustees moved to construct a new building in order to facilitate access to the Athenaeum.  Land was acquired on Beacon Street overlooking the Old Granary Burying Ground, and the cornerstone was laid in 1847.

In 1849, the current location opened at 10½ Beacon Street. It was the first space designed for the Boston Athenaeum's specific needs. The first floor held the sculpture gallery; the second, the library; and the third, the paintings gallery.

The architect was Edward Clarke Cabot, an artist and dilettante whose design was selected because his ingenious arch over graves in the Granary Burial Ground allowed more space on all floors above the basement level. The neo-Palladian façade of "Patterson sandstone" was unique in Boston and remains so today.

The Boston Athenaeum included sculptures by John Frazee.

Cutter Expansive Classification

Charles Ammi Cutter became librarian in 1869, succeeding William Frederick Poole.  Until this point, work had been uninspired on the comprehensive catalog of the library's holdings. The Athenaeum's exhibition area opened up when the Museum of Fine Arts moved the collections into their own space overlooking Copley Square. Cutter took advantage of the space, using it to spread out the collections and to revise and complete the five-volume catalog. He created his own classification system, known as Expansive Classification, in order to revise and finish the five-volume catalog. Later, the Cutter system became the basis for the Library of Congress classification system; the sections of call number used to alphabetically designate authors’ names are still known as "Cutter numbers" in the Library of Congress system.

Establishment of Museum of Fine Arts
Many of the Trustees at the Boston Athenaeum participated in the movement to create a separate museum in Boston. In the years 1872–1876, Boston's Museum of Fine Arts exhibited in the Athenaeum's gallery space while waiting for construction of its building to be complete. There would be no more annual exhibitions; shelves were installed and the library spread to the first and third floors.

20th and 21st centuries
From 1913–1914, the Boston Athenaeum employed the architectural firm of Bigelow and Wadsworth to expand the building. The fourth and fifth floors were set back so as not to disrupt the symmetry of the façade. This renovation fireproofed the building and expanded the space, including the addition of the beautiful fifth floor reading room and the fourth floor Trustees’ Room. At the same time, much-needed shelving was installed in the form of a drum stack — a ten-story Snead stack occupying a semi-circular space from the basement to the third floor.

The Boston Athenaeum was declared a National Historic Landmark in 1966. Between 1999 and 2002, the Boston Athenaeum underwent a major renovation to update its climate control system, gain more space for books, and add new gallery space on the first floor.

In May 2020, Leah Rosovsky was appointed as Stanford Calderwood Director of the Athenaeum.

Gilbert Stuart portraits

The Athenæum had long owned two famous, unfinished portraits of George and Martha Washington. They had been on loan to the Boston Museum of Fine Art since 1876, but eventually the Athenæum, needing money, asked the Museum to purchase them outright, which the Museum declined to do. 
The Athenæum then agreed to sell the portraits to the National Portrait Gallery (an arm of the Smithsonian Institution in Washington, D.C.) for $5 million; when this agreement became public in April 1979, there was strong public opposition to it in Boston but the National Portrait Gallery argued that the portraits were of national historic value and belonged in the Smithsonian.

A campaign by prominent Bostonians to raise $5 million to keep the portraits in Massachusetts fell well short of its goal. The Athenæum refused to lower the $5 million price, which it called a significant discount from the portraits' market value.
The City of Boston sued to forestall the sale, naming Massachusetts Attorney General Francis X. Bellotti (whose office the Commonwealth's constitution designates as "custodian of public property") in the suit, and this led to Bellotti to declare that the portraits could not be sold without his permission.

In early 1980, the National Portrait Gallery and the Boston Museum of Fine Arts agreed to jointly purchase the portraits, which would then spend alternating three-year terms at each institution.

Notable members

 Hannah Adams
 John Adams 
 John Quincy Adams
 Louisa May Alcott
 Cyrus Alger
 Erastus Brigham Bigelow
 Nathaniel Bowditch
 Uriah Boyden
 Josiah Cooke, Jr.
 Charles Ammi Cutter
 Ralph Waldo Emerson
 Margaret Fuller
 Samuel Griswold Goodrich
 Augustus Addison Gould
 Nathaniel Hawthorne
 Oliver Wendell Holmes, Sr.
 Oliver Wendell Holmes, Jr.
 John Jay Chapman
 John Fitzgerald Kennedy
 Edward M. Kennedy
 Amy Lowell
 Paul Moody
 Daniel Treadwell
 Francis Parkman

Mission statement

The mission of the Boston Athenaeum is to engage all who seek knowledge by making accessible the library's collections and spaces, thereby inspiring reflection, discourse, creative expression, and joy.

Holdings

The Athenaeum's holdings currently include over 600,000 volumes, and the collections' strengths focus on Boston and New England history, biography, British and American literature, as well as fine and decorative arts. The Boston Athenaeum's rare and circulating books, maps and manuscripts reflect the collecting interests of the Library as it has narrowed its focus from encyclopedic in the 19th century to an emphasis on the humanities and its large, historic collection of art includes paintings, sculpture, prints, photographs, and decorative arts. Over 260 book funds, the oldest and largest of which was endowed by John Bromfield, Jr. in 1845, support the addition of more than 3,000 volumes per year to the collection.

Printed Catalogs

In addition to catalogs of special collections such as the catalog of the Washington Collection, the Athenaeum printed the following general-purpose catalogs of books in its collection before creating a card catalog in 1903:

 1810 Catalogue of the books in the Boston Athenaeum. 267 pp. 8° 
 1827 Catalogue of books in the Boston Athenaeum : to which are added the by-laws of the institution, and a list of its proprietors and subscribers. 356 pp. 8°
 1830 Catalogue of books added to the Boston Athenaeum since the publication of the catalogue in January 1827. 64 pp. 8°
 1831 Catalogue of tracts, scientific and alphabetical index. 5 v.
 1834 Catalogue of books added to the Boston Athenaeum in 1830–1833. 80 pp. 8°
 1840 Catalogue of books added to the Boston Athenaeum, since the publication of the catalogue in January, 1827. 179 pp. 8°
 1849 Shelf Lists, 1849.
 1863–1868 List of books added to the library of the Boston Athenaeum. 6 v. 8°
 1868–1871 List of books added to the library of the Boston Athenaeum. 17 nos. 8°
 1877–1896 List of additions. Second Series. No. 1–354. September 1, 187 to March 2, 1896. 1472 pp. sm. 4°
 1874 Catalogue of the library of the Boston Athenaeum. 1807–1871. 5 v. 3402 pp. l. 8°

The first catalog, that of 1810, was compiled by the Rev. Joseph McKean.

Digital Collections 
The Athenaeum has digitized a wide range of its holdings, and continues to do so. The digitized holdings are described on-line and are an effort to make them more accessible to researchers, students, Athenaeum members, and scholars.

A few examples from the many collections in the digital library:
 Henry Schoolcraft Collection of Books in Native American Languages 
 Confederate States of America Imprint Collection - stamps, paper currency, and financial documents 
 Art Deco Designs by Cartier
 Rare bookbindings from George Washington’s personal library 
Alice Mason Civil War Photography,

Since 2013, the Athenaeum has made its extensive on-going lecture series available to a wider audience through Vimeo, an open video platform.

Rare Books & Manuscripts Collections 
A few examples of the special collections:
 Portions of the personal libraries of Cardinal Cheverus, Henry Knox, and George Washington.
 The Groome Gypsy Collection, the Danforth  Alchemy Collection, and the Merrymount Press Collection.
The collections include many areas that are not documented elsewhere, e.g, the newspapers from the Confederate States of America Imprint Collection

Image gallery

In popular culture 
 In the 1998 film A Civil Action, the Boston Athenaeum is used as a stand-in for the Harvard Club of New York.

See also
List of National Historic Landmarks in Boston
National Register of Historic Places listings in northern Boston, Massachusetts

References

Further reading
 William Smith Shaw, Memoir of the Boston Athenaeum with the Act of Incorporation and Organization of the Institution. Boston, MA: Munroe & Francis, 1807.Google books
  Josiah Quincy III, The History of the Boston Athenaeum, with Biographical Notices of its Deceased Founders. Cambridge, Massachusetts: Metcalf and Company, 1851. Google books
 The Athenæum Centenary, The Influence and History of the Boston Athenaeum from 1807 to 1907 with a Record of its Officers and Benefactors and a Complete List of Proprietors. Boston, The Boston Athenæum, 1907. Google books
 Robert F. Perkins, Jr. & William J. Gavin III, editors, The Boston Athenaeum  Art Exhibition Index, 1827-1874.  Boston, MA: The Boston Athenæum, 1980.

External links

The Boston Athenaeum website
 Flickr. George Washington (The Athenæum Portrait)
 https://www.flickr.com/photos/24934245@N00/2065520083/
 https://www.flickr.com/photos/29498542@N05/3118776762/
 https://www.flickr.com/photos/21843970@N00/421678201/
 https://www.flickr.com/photos/solongago/3771609879/
 https://www.flickr.com/photos/lizmuir/4226349943/
 Simmons panel on Athenæum history, 2010

Art museums and galleries in Massachusetts
Athenaeum, Boston
Athenaeum, Boston
Libraries established in 1807
Athenaeum, Boston
Athenaeum, Boston
Libraries on the National Register of Historic Places in Massachusetts
Library buildings completed in 1849
Athenaeum, Boston
National Historic Landmarks in Boston
Neoclassical architecture in Massachusetts
Renaissance Revival architecture in Massachusetts
Subscription libraries in the United States
1807 establishments in Massachusetts
Rare book libraries in the United States
Historic district contributing properties in Massachusetts
Museums established in 1807
National Register of Historic Places in Boston
Research libraries in the United States